Pedro Vanneste (born 7 December 1969) is a Belgian badminton player. He competed in the men's singles tournament at the 1992 Summer Olympics.

References

1969 births
Living people
Belgian male badminton players
Olympic badminton players of Belgium
Badminton players at the 1992 Summer Olympics
Sportspeople from Kortrijk